Victor-Amédée Barbié du Bocage (28 January 1832 – 11 October 1890) was a French geographer.

1832 births
1890 deaths
Chevaliers of the Légion d'honneur
French geographers
Scientists from Paris